The following highways are numbered 960:

United States